Alexis Vuillermoz (born 1 June 1988) is a French road bicycle racer, who currently rides for UCI ProTeam .

Career
He was originally a mountain bike racer before switching to road cycling, winning the French national under-23 mountain bike title twice and riding as part of the French national team that took the team relay title at the 2008 Mountain Bike World Championships. He was a member of the  team that competed at the 2013 Tour de France, finishing the race 46th overall.

Vuillermoz joined  for the 2014 season, after his previous team –  – folded at the end of the 2013 season. In the eighth stage of the 2015 Tour de France, Vuillermoz attacked the leading group on the Mûr-de-Bretagne to cross the line solo atop the hill. "After winning I thought about my dad who died three years ago. He was the one who got me interested in the Tour de France, he used to take my cousins and I to the side of the road to watch the Tour go past," said Vuillermoz. "I hope today he's proud of me."

In 2016, Vuillermoz finished in 23rd position in the Olympics men's road race and in 29th position in the Olympic men's road time trial.

He started the 2018 Tour de France, but was forced to abandon with a fractured scapula due to injuries sustained after colliding with a roadside spectator trying to take a photo in one of the cobbled sectors on stage 9 to Roubaix.

In October 2020, Vuillermoz signed a two-year contract with the  team, from the 2021 season.

Major results

Mountain Bike

2005
 3rd  Team relay, UCI World Championships
 3rd Cross-country, National Junior Championships
2006
 1st  Cross-country, National Junior Championships
 2nd  Cross-country, UEC European Junior Championships
2008
 1st  Team relay, UCI World Championships
 1st  Team relay, UEC European Championships
2009
 1st  Cross-country, National Under-23 Championships
 2nd  Cross-country, UCI World Under-23 Championships
2010
 1st  Cross-country, National Under-23 Championships

Road

2012
 5th Overall Tour des Pays de Savoie
2013
 5th Overall Rhône-Alpes Isère Tour
2014
 1st  Mountains classification, Route du Sud
 3rd Overall Tour du Gévaudan Languedoc-Roussillon
1st Stage 2
 5th Tour du Doubs
 8th Overall Critérium International
2015
 1st Grand Prix de Plumelec-Morbihan
 1st International Road Cycling Challenge
 1st Stage 8 Tour de France
 6th Overall Tour du Gévaudan Languedoc-Roussillon
1st Stage 2
 6th La Flèche Wallonne
 9th Overall Tour du Haut Var
 9th Overall Critérium International
2016
 2nd Grand Prix de Plumelec-Morbihan
 3rd Road race, National Road Championships
 5th Overall Critérium International
2017
 1st  Overall Tour du Limousin
1st Stage 2
 1st Grand Prix de Plumelec-Morbihan
 4th Giro di Lombardia
 4th Grand Prix Cycliste de Québec
 6th Giro dell'Emilia
2018
 2nd Overall Tour du Haut Var
 4th Classic de l'Ardèche
 5th Grand Prix de Plumelec-Morbihan
 5th Coppa Sabatini
 8th Overall Paris–Nice
2019
 1st La Drôme Classic
 4th Overall Tour du Haut Var
 7th Classic Sud-Ardèche
2021
 4th Tour du Finistère
 7th Overall Tour du Rwanda
2022
 1st Stage 2 Critérium du Dauphiné
 3rd Gran Piemonte
 3rd Classic Grand Besançon Doubs
 4th GP Miguel Induráin
 6th La Drôme Classic
 7th Overall Tour des Alpes-Maritimes et du Var
 10th Overall Vuelta a Asturias
 10th La Flèche Wallonne
 10th Faun-Ardèche Classic

Grand Tour general classification results timeline

References

External links

 
 
 
 
 
 

1988 births
Living people
French male cyclists
People from Saint-Claude, Jura
French Tour de France stage winners
Cyclists at the 2016 Summer Olympics
Olympic cyclists of France
Sportspeople from Jura (department)
Cyclists from Bourgogne-Franche-Comté